The Love Captive is a 1934 American drama film directed by Max Marcin and written by Karen DeWolf, adapted from Marcin's play of the same name. The film stars Gloria Stuart, Nils Asther, Paul Kelly, Alan Dinehart, Renee Gadd, and Russ Brown. The film was released on June 7, 1934, by Universal Pictures.

Plot
A diabolical hypnotist huckster is accused of casting spells on the minds of his female patients. Eventually a woman and her fiance exact their revenge on him.

Cast 
Gloria Stuart as Alice Trask
Nils Asther as Dr. Alexis Collender
Paul Kelly as Dr. Norman Ware
Alan Dinehart as Roger Loft
Renee Gadd as Valerie Loft
Russ Brown as Larry Chapman
Virginia Kami as Mary Williams
John Wray as Jules Glass
Ellalee Ruby as Annie Noland
Addison Richards as Dr. Collins
Robert Greig as First Butler

References

External links 
 

1934 films
American drama films
1934 drama films
Universal Pictures films
American black-and-white films
1930s English-language films
1930s American films